= Marguit =

Oil tanker

The Marguit was an oil tanker owned and operated by the Chilean firm of Torres & Ware. It was destroyed by fire on 29 November 1932.

== Accident ==
While anchored near Los Reyes Island (36.727°S 73.058°W) off Talcahuano, Chile, on 29 November 1932, with over 70,000 gallons of gasoline of the Standard Oil Company aboard, the Marguit was destroyed by fire. All members of the crew were removed safely, but the vessel, insured with Lloyd's of London for $40,000, was declared a total loss.
